...And Then There Was X is the third studio album by American rapper DMX. The album was released on December 21, 1999, by Ruff Ryders Entertainment and Def Jam Recordings. The album was certified 5x Platinum by the RIAA on February 7, 2001. The album was nominated for Best Rap Album at the 2001 Grammys.

Singles 
The album's first single "What's My Name" was released on December 28, 1999. It reached #67 on the Billboard Hot 100 chart. The second single "Party Up (Up in Here)" was released on February 20, 2000, and became his most successful single of his career peaking at number 27 on the Hot 100. The third single "What These Bitches Want" featuring Sisqó was released on June 6, 2000, which peaked at number 49.

Commercial performance
... And Then There Was X debuted at number one the US Billboard 200 chart, selling 698,000 copies in its first week, according to Nielsen Soundscan. This became DMX's third US number one debut. In its second week, the album dropped to number two on the chart, selling an additional 399,000 copies.  On February 7, 2001, the album was certified five times platinum by the Recording Industry Association of America (RIAA) for shipments of over five million copies in the US. As of October 2009, the album has sold 4,950,000 copies in the United States.

Track listing 
Credits adapted from the album's liner notes.

Charts

Weekly charts

Year-end charts

Certifications

References 

DMX (rapper) albums
1999 albums
Albums produced by Dame Grease
Albums produced by Irv Gotti
Albums produced by Swizz Beatz
Def Jam Recordings albums
Ruff Ryders Entertainment albums